Dar ul-Funun may refer to:

 Dar ul-Funun (Persia), an institution of higher learning in Tehran
 Istanbul University, the older name of which was Darülfünun